Connor Shields (born 29 July 1997) is a Scottish professional footballer who plays as a striker for Queen's Park, on loan from Motherwell. He has previously played for Albion Rovers, Sunderland, Aldershot Town and Queen of the South. Shields has also had loan spells with Alloa Athletic and Billercay Town.

Career
Shields started his career at Albion Rovers during the 2015–16 season.

In January 2018, Shields earned a move to England, signing for Sunderland. In August 2018, Shields was loaned to Alloa Athletic for six months. Shields was released by Sunderland at the end of the 2018–19 season and received interest and offers from a number of clubs.

In June 2019, Shields signed for Aldershot Town on a one-year deal. In March 2020 he moved on loan to Billericay Town, scoring on his debut.

In August 2020, Shields signed for Queen of the South on a one-year deal.

On 27 May 2021, Shields signed a three-year deal with Scottish Premiership club Motherwell. He scored his first goal for the club on 20 November 2021, in a 2–0 home win against Heart of Midlothian.

On 31 January 2023, Shields joined Scottish Championship club Queen's Park on loan until the end of the season.

Career statistics

References

1997 births
Living people
Footballers from Coatbridge
Scottish footballers
Albion Rovers F.C. players
Sunderland A.F.C. players
Alloa Athletic F.C. players
Aldershot Town F.C. players
Queen of the South F.C. players
Scottish Professional Football League players
National League (English football) players
Association football forwards
Billericay Town F.C. players
Motherwell F.C. players
Queen's Park F.C. players